Luxembourg competed at the 2020 Winter Youth Olympics in Lausanne, Switzerland from 9 to 22 January 2020.

Alpine skiing

Boys

Ice hockey

Mixed NOC 3x3 tournament 

Boys
Nicolas Elgas

Girls
Lina Meijer

Short track speed skating

One Luxembourgian skater achieved a quota place for Luxembourg based on the results of the 2019 World Junior Short Track Speed Skating Championships.

Girls

Mixed team relay

See also
Luxembourg at the 2020 Summer Olympics

References 

2020 in Luxembourgian sport
Nations at the 2020 Winter Youth Olympics
Luxembourg at the Youth Olympics